Gabriel King may refer to:

 Gabriel King, joint pseudonym of authors Jane Johnson & M. John Harrison
 Gabriel King (mayor), mayor of Galway 1657-58